Harold Ashby (March 27, 1925, in Kansas City, Missouri, United States – June 13, 2003, in New York City) was an American jazz tenor saxophonist. He worked with Duke Ellington's band, replacing Jimmy Hamilton in 1968. In 1959, he recorded backing Willie Dixon on the latter's first album, Willie's Blues.

After leaving the Duke Ellington Orchestra in 1975, Ashby worked as a freelance musician and took part in various reunions of Ellington alumni, as well as recording and gigging with his own bands.

Ashby suffered a heart attack in May 2003, and was hospitalized before dying at the age of 78, on June 13 that year.

Discography

As leader
 Born to Swing: Introducing The Compulsive Tenor Saxophone of Harold Ashby (Columbia, 1960)
 Tenor Stuff with Paul Gonsalves (Metronome, 1961)
 Scufflin''' (Black and Blue, 1978)
 Presenting Harold Ashby (Progressive, 1981)
 I'm Old Fashioned (Stash, 1991)
 What Am I Here For? with Mulgrew Miller, Rufus Reid, Ben Riley (Criss Cross, 1992)
 On the Sunny Side of the Street (Timeless, 1992)
 Out of Nowhere with Wild Bill Davis (Black and Blue, 1993)
 Just for You (Mapleshade)

As sideman
 Eugenie Baird, Eugenie Baird Sings, Duke's Boys Play Ellington (Stereo Spectrum, Design 1959)
 Lawrence Brown, Inspired Abandon (Impulse!, 1965)
 Benny Golson, Tenor Legacy (Arkadia Jazz, 1998)
 Scott Hamilton, Skyscrapers (Concord Jazz, 1980)
 Earl Hines, Once Upon a Time (Impulse!, 1966)
 Milt Hinton, Laughing at Life (Columbia, 1994)
 Butch Miles, Butch's Encore (Famous Door, 1979)
 Otis Rush, This One's a Good 'Un (Blue Horizon, 1969)
 Bennie Wallace, The Art of the Saxophone (Denon, 1987)
 Ben Webster, The Soul of Ben Webster'' (Verve, 1960)

References

1925 births
2003 deaths
20th-century saxophonists
African-American jazz musicians
Duke Ellington Orchestra members
Jazz musicians from Missouri
Jazz tenor saxophonists
Musicians from Kansas City, Missouri
Black & Blue Records artists
Mapleshade Records artists
Criss Cross Jazz artists
Timeless Records artists